In the context of war, perfidy is a form of deception in which one side promises to act in good faith (such as by raising a flag of truce) with the intention of breaking that promise once the unsuspecting enemy is exposed (such as by coming out of cover to take the "surrendering" prisoners into custody). 

Perfidy constitutes a breach of the laws of war and so is a war crime, as it degrades the protections and mutual restraints developed in the interest of all parties, combatants and civilians.

Geneva Conventions
Perfidy is specifically prohibited under the 1977 Protocol I Additional to the Geneva Conventions of 12 August 1949, which states:

Article 37. – Prohibition of perfidy

Article 38. – Recognized emblems

Article 39. – Emblems of nationality

History
Disapproval of perfidy was part of the customary laws of war long before the prohibition of perfidy was included in Protocol I. For example, in the 1907 Hague Convention IV - The Laws and Customs of War on Land, Article 23 includes:

The Kilmichael Ambush (1921), part of the Irish War of Independence, was the scene of a notorious act of alleged perfidy. 36 members of the Irish Republican Army ambushed a truck carrying 18 Auxiliary Division officers. IRA leader Tom Barry claimed in his memoirs, Guerrilla Days in Ireland, that some of the Auxiliaries shouted, "We surrender, we surrender;" when IRA men stood up from their positions, they were fired upon by other Auxiliaries. This led Barry to not believe the Auxiliaries when, later in the battle, they attempted to surrender: all 18 were shot and left for dead. One Auxiliary escaped but was later captured and killed; another, Frederick Henry Forde, survived with severe injuries and was rescued by British forces. However, some historians have claimed that Barry invented the story of the false surrender in order to justify the killing of the entire unit.

During the Pacific Theatre of World War II, Japanese soldiers were reported to often booby-trap their dead and wounded and to fake surrenders or injuries to lure Allied troops into a trap then surprise attack them. One example was the "Goettge Patrol", during the early days of the Guadalcanal Campaign in 1942, in which an allegedly fake Japanese surrender resulted in more than 20 US deaths. It has been asserted that the incident, along with many other perfidious actions of the Japanese throughout the Pacific War, led to an Allied tendency to shoot the dead or wounded Japanese soldiers and those who were attempting to surrender and not to take them as POWs easily.

At the Dachau Trials, the issue of whether the donning of enemy uniforms to approach the enemy without drawing fire was within the laws of war was established under international humanitarian law at the trial in 1947 of the planner and commander of Operation Greif, Otto Skorzeny. He  was found not guilty by a US military tribunal of a crime by ordering his men into action in US uniforms. He had passed on to his men the warning of German legal experts that if they fought in US uniforms, they would be breaking the laws of war. During the trial, a number of arguments were advanced to substantiate this position and that the German and US militaries seem to be in agreement on it. In its judgement, the tribunal noted that the case did not require that the tribunal make findings other than those of guilty or not guilty and so no safe conclusion could be drawn from the acquittal of all accused. The tribunal also emphasized the difference between using enemy uniforms in espionage versus combat.

See also 
 Bad faith
 False flag
 Good faith
 Betrayal
 Inherent bad faith model
 Unsportsmanlike conduct
 War Crimes Act of 1996 (incorporated into US law)

References

External links 

 UK's Geneva Conventions (Amendment) Act 1995 which bans perfidy

Deception
Military deception
War crimes by type